The   Cima Cars is a mountain of the Ligurian Alps located in Piedmont (NW Italy).

Geography  

The mountain stands on the ridge dividing the valleys of Ellero and Pesio. Is located between Colletto Pellerina (2.017 m, North) and Colle di Serpentera (2.035 m, South). Westwards from its summit  starts a third ridge which divides two tributary valleys of the Pesio, vallone Serpentera (S) and vallone del Funtanin; on this ridge, close to a saddle at 1.985 m and a summit of 2.030 m, stands the Punta Bartivolera (1.957 m). The topographic prominence of Cima Cars is of 183 m, as results from the drop in height between the summit (2.218 m) and Colle di Serpentera (2.035 m), its key col. Some summit crosses stand on subsummits of Cima Cars located on its Ellero valley side.

SOIUSA classification 
According to the SOIUSA (International Standardized Mountain Subdivision of the Alps) the mountain can be classified in the following way:
 main part = Western Alps
 major sector = South Western Alps
 section = Ligurian Alps
 subsection = It:Alpi del Marguareis/Fr:Alpes Liguriennes Occidentales
 supergroup = It:Catena Marguareis-Mongioie/Fr:Chaîne Marguareis-Mongioie
 group = It:Gruppo del Marguareis
 subgroup = It:Dorsale Serpentera-Cars  
 code = I/A-1.II-B.2.b

Geology 
The area where the mountain stands is of karstic nature. The name Cars itself is linked to this geological feature, as other toponyms of the Ligurian Alps like as Le Carsene, Sella del Cars, Monte Carsino etc.

Access to the summit 
Cima Cars con be reached by a waymarked foothpath starting from Pian delle Gorre (Pesio valley), or from the Ellero valley, in this case starting from Ponte Murato (Pian Marchisio). 

The mountain is also a classical destination for Ski mountaineering, considered quite engaging (BS - good skiers - difficulty).

Mountain huts
 Rifugio Pian delle Gorre (1.023 m).

Conservation 
The western slopes of the mountain, facing the Pesio Valley, are part of the Natural Park of Marguareis, a nature reserve established by Regione Piemonte.

References

Bibliography 
 Sergio Marazzi, Atlante Orografico delle Alpi. SOIUSA. Pavone Canavese (TO), Priuli & Verlucca editori, 2005.

Maps 
 
 
 

Mountains of the Ligurian Alps
Mountains of Piedmont
Two-thousanders of Italy